DMFT may refer to: 

 Dynamical mean field theory, a method to determine the electronic structure of strongly correlated materials
 Decayed, missing, and filled teeth index, a quantification of dental caries burden
 Doctor of marriage and family therapy, a professional doctorate in counseling